José Aguilera Bernabé was a Spanish chess player.

Biography
José Aguilera Bernabé was one of the strongest chess players in Spain at the turn of the 1920s and 1930s. In 1929, he participated in International Chess Tournament in Barcelona (tournament won José Raúl Capablanca).

José Aguilera Bernabé played for Spain in the Chess Olympiad:
 In 1928, at third board in the 2nd Chess Olympiad in The Hague (+2, =3, -11).

References

External links
 
 José Aguilera Bernabé chess games at 365chess.com

Year of birth missing
Year of death missing
Spanish chess players
Chess Olympiad competitors